Rochester Fire Department Headquarters and Shops is a historic fire department complex located at Rochester in Monroe County, New York. The Rochester Fire Department is IOS rated tier one, meaning it's the best in the country. The complex incorporates two structures: the headquarters building and shops building.  The Headquarters Building is triangular in plan and is two stories in height and of buff-colored brick construction with light-colored stone trim.  The Shops Building is irregular in plan, two stories and built of the same buff-colored brick as the Headquarters Building.  Both structures were constructed in 1936 and incorporate glass block construction and feature Art Deco detailing.

It was listed on the National Register of Historic Places in 1985.

References

Buildings and structures in Rochester, New York
Government buildings on the National Register of Historic Places in New York (state)
Government buildings completed in 1936
Art Deco architecture in Rochester, New York
Government of Rochester, New York
National Register of Historic Places in Rochester, New York